Canada had 1,137 municipalities that held city, town or ville status as of 2011. This list presents the 100 largest of these municipalities by land area in square kilometres at the time of the 2011 census.

The geographically massive cities in Quebecthree of them larger than the entire province of Prince Edward Islandwere created in the 1990s, when the provincial government added some vast unorganized areas (territoires non organisés) into self-governing municipalities, centred on a single dominant urban centre and surrounded by extensive tracts of forest and sparsely populated expanses.

The geographically massive cities in Ontario were created in the 1990s, when the provincial government converted some counties and regional municipalities into self-governing rural single-tier municipalities, centred on a single dominant urban centre and what were formerly its suburbs and relatively nearby satellite towns and villages, including large tracts of rural land. (This article uses loose imprecise translation of “Ville” and the first 4 on the list are “Municipalities” and not “Cities”)

List

See also 

List of the largest municipalities in Canada by population
List of the largest population centres in Canada
List of census metropolitan areas and agglomerations in Canada
List of largest Canadian cities by census
Population of Canada by province and territory
Population of Canada by year
List of cities in Canada
List of towns in Canada
Regional municipality

Notes

References 

Area
Canada cities and towns
Canada cities and towns
Cities and towns by area